Feliciano López and Marc López were the defending champions, but chose not to participate together. Feliciano López played alongside Pablo Carreño Busta, but lost in the semifinals to Juan Sebastián Cabal and Robert Farah. Marc López teamed up with Marcel Granollers, but lost in the first round to Raven Klaasen and Joe Salisbury.

Cabal and Farah went on to win the title, defeating Jamie Murray and Bruno Soares in the final, 6–4, 7–6(7–4).

Seeds

Draw

Draw

Qualifying

Seeds

Qualifiers
  Roberto Carballés Baena /  Jaume Munar

Qualifying draw

References

External links
 Main Draw
 Qualifying Draw

Barcelona Open Banco Sabadell - Doubles